Schoofs is a surname. Notable people with the surname include:

Bibiane Schoofs (born 1988), Dutch tennis player
Henri Schoofs (born 1950), Belgian long-distance runner
Lucas Schoofs (born 1997), Belgian footballer
Mark Schoofs, American journalist
Rob Schoofs (born 1994), Belgian footballer

See also
Schoofs Nunatak, a nunatak of Palmer Land, Antarctica
Schoof